Mothonodes is a genus of moths in the family Cosmopterigidae. It contains only one species, Mothonodes obusta, which is found in Australia.

References

Cosmopterigidae
Monotypic moth genera
Taxa named by Edward Meyrick